Thaumastocera cervaria is a species of Horse fly in the family Tabanidae.

Distribution
Angola & Ghana & Congo.

References

Tabanidae
Insects described in 1935
Diptera of Africa
Taxa named by Eugène Séguy